San Julián de Banzo is a locality located in the municipality of Loporzano, in the Huesca province, Aragon, Spain. As of 2020, it has a population of 28.

Geography 
San Julián de Banzo is located 23km north-northeast of Huesca.

References

Populated places in the Province of Huesca